Hoplocharax goethei is a species of characin endemic to Brazil where it is found in the Amazon Basin. 
It is the only member of its genus.  It is commonly found in freshwater environments at a benthopelagic depth. This species is native to a tropical environment.  This fish can reach a length of about 3 cm (1.2 in) as an unsexed male.

References

Notes
 

Characidae
Monotypic fish genera
Fish of South America
Fish of Brazil
Endemic fauna of Brazil
Fish described in 1966